Jim Cullen (9 June 1878 – 9 May 1954) was a former Australian rules footballer who played with the Essendon Football Club, South Melbourne Football Club and Carlton Football Club in the Victorian Football League (VFL). He was also listed with the Melbourne Football Club, but never played a game.

Notes

External links 
		
Jim Cullen's profile at Blueseum

1878 births
Place of birth missing
Australian rules footballers from Victoria (Australia)
Essendon Football Club players
Sydney Swans players
Carlton Football Club players
Port Melbourne Football Club players
1954 deaths